Crime Wave (also known as The City Is Dark) is a 1954 American film noir starring Sterling Hayden and Gene Nelson, and directed by Andre DeToth. It was adapted from a short story which originally appeared in The Saturday Evening Post - "Criminal Mark" by John and Ward Hawkins.

Plot
'Doc' Penny and two other members of his gang, who have recently broken out of San Quentin, rob a gasoline station. In the process a police officer is killed and one of the gang members is wounded. As a city-wide search ensues, a hard-nosed detective named Lieutenant Sims searches records in an effort to determine if there is an ex-con the thugs might contact. Sims rejects professionalism and logic and operates on raw emotion. He feels that Steve Lacey is a good candidate for the killers to contact, though he has been out of prison for two years and is trying hard to maintain his new life. Steve regularly receives phone calls from ex-cons who pass through town, each trying to "put the bite" on him. When Sims' man phones Steve, he does not answer; he had already received an anonymous call from someone both he and his wife Ellen assumed to be yet another former prisoner, and she persuades him to not pick up. This sparks Sims to suspect Steve of being involved in the crime.

Gat Morgan, the wounded man, knocks at Steve's door. The criminal has already summoned a disreputable, alcoholic former doctor who is now a veterinarian, Otto Hessler, whom both men knew in prison; Steve demands Morgan leave, but he says he is "hurt bad" and cannot move.  Shortly after he says this, he dies. The doctor arrives and confirms this, grabs his fee from the dead man's jacket, and leaves. Steve recognizes that the other two escapees, Penny and Hastings, will likely arrive soon. Ellen convinces him to phone his parole officer; while they are talking, Sims shows up. He grills Steve, demonstrating that he believes "once a crook, always a crook" and takes him to jail for three days, threatening him with fresh charges if he does not help catch Penny and Hastings. Steve refuses.

When Steve and Ellen get home after his release, the two men turn up and impose themselves. Fearing for Ellen's safety, Steve resigns himself to having them there for "a couple of days."  Sims visits Hessler and persuades him to go to Steve's to ascertain if he has heard, or expects to hear, from his old prison mates. The veterinarian does what he is told and happens to overhear men's voices in the apartment, though he does not see anyone other than Steve. After Hessler is shaken up by Steve and leaves, Hastings follows him, in Steve's car, to the dog and cat hospital where he prevents Hessler's phone call to the police by murdering him.

Penny, meanwhile, is laying out the details of his plan to rob a bank. Steve insists he will not be involved but when Hastings returns to report that he has "fixed" Hessler "real good" and, because someone heard the commotion and summoned police, he had to leave Steve's car behind, Penny notes that Steve is involved whether he wants to be or not. Penny then decides that all four will leave the apartment and set the bank job in motion. Sims finds the car and immediately orders an All Points Bulletin be issued for Steve Lacey, "wanted for murder."

Penny and Hastings direct Steve, in a stolen car, to a hideout where two other thugs are waiting. The deal is set that Steve must help with the robbery, as getaway driver, or Ellen will be harmed.

When they pull the job, the criminals are ambushed; the entire bank is staffed with police officers. Steve takes off for the hideout, with Sims in pursuit. At the hideout, Steve fights off the gang member who is holding Ellen hostage. Sims takes the couple away in his car.  After revealing that the note Steve left in his medicine cabinet, alerting police to the robbery, was found and helped to set the trap, Sims lectures Steve about how he chose to handle the situation - "Next time, Lacey, call me...you got trouble, you need help, call me."  He then sends the two home.

Cast

 Sterling Hayden as Detective Lieutenant Sims
 Gene Nelson as Steve Lacey
 Phyllis Kirk as Ellen Lacey
 Ted de Corsia as 'Doc' Penny
 Charles Bronson as Ben Hastings (credited as Charles Buchinsky)
 Jay Novello as Otto Hessler
 Ned Young as Gat Morgan
 James Bell as Daniel O'Keefe, Steve's Parole Officer
 Dub Taylor as Gus Snider 
 Gayle Kellogg as Detective 
 Mack Chandler as Sully 
 Timothy Carey as Johnny Haslett (uncredited)
 Sandy Sanders as Murdered Officer (uncredited)
 Richard Benjamin as Mark (uncredited)
 James Hayward as Zenner (uncredited)
 Lyle Latell as Hoodlum at Counter (uncredited)

Production

Much of the film was shot on location in Los Angeles and in nearby Burbank and Glendale. At least one 1952 location, Sawyer's Pet Hospital at the corner of San Fernando Road and Alma Street in Glendale, is still standing and still a pet hospital, albeit with a different name. Several locations seen onscreen, like the Bank of America on the southwest corner of Brand Boulevard and Broadway in Glendale (where the film's big robbery attempt takes place), as well as the distinctive dental building across Brand Boulevard, have been torn down and replaced.

The final chase scene from the bank in Glendale to Chinatown in downtown Los Angeles, though edited, follows the actual route, including Brand Boulevard and the Glendale Boulevard fork on the Hyperion Viaduct, until Steve Lacey reaches the house (possibly on Maple Street, just east of Los Angeles Street in the Chinatown district) where the crazed Johnny Haslett is holding Lacey's wife. The gas station in the film's opening scene, on Wall Street just south of East 3rd Street, near Boyd Street, has since been demolished. Other specific downtown Los Angeles locations include Los Angeles Union Station and the L.A. City Hall Building (including interiors of the Homicide Bureau). The final scene, where Lt. Sims sends Steve and Ellen home, was shot on the 200 block of North Main Street, with Sterling Hayden leaning against the side of the City Hall Building.

Release 
Crime Wave was first released in Italy and Britain in 1953.  It premiered in the U.S. on January 12, 1954 in New York City.

References

External links
 
 
 
 
 
 Crime Wave location shooting information at Tropico Station
 

1954 films
1954 crime films
American crime thriller films
American black-and-white films
Film noir
Films based on short fiction
Films directed by Andre DeToth
Films scored by David Buttolph
Warner Bros. films
1950s English-language films
1950s crime thriller films
1950s American films